Lee Jian-liang (born 10 August 1991) is a Taiwanese footballer who currently plays as a defender for the national and club level. Lee is an indigenous Taiwanese and is of Truku descent.

References

1991 births
Living people
Taiwanese footballers
Chinese Taipei international footballers
People from Hualien County
Truku people
Association football defenders